Louis-Joseph-Lucien Cardin,  (March 1, 1919 – June 13, 1988) was a Canadian lawyer, judge, and politician.

Born in Providence, Rhode Island, the son of Octave Cardin and Eldora Pagé, he studied at Loyola College and at the Université de Montréal. During World War II, he served in the Royal Canadian Navy and was discharged with the rank of Lieutenant Commander. He was called to the Quebec Bar in 1950.

In a 1952 by-election, he was elected to the House of Commons of Canada as a Liberal in the Quebec riding of Richelieu—Verchères. He was re-elected in 1953, 1957, 1958, 1962, 1963, and 1965.

From 1956 to 1957, he was the Parliamentary Assistant to the Secretary of State for External Affairs. From 1963 to 1965, he was the Associate Minister of National Defence. In 1965, he was the Minister of Public Works. From 1965 to 1967, he was the Minister of Justice and Attorney General of Canada.

Cardin was the first Canadian politician to bring the public's attention to the Munsinger affair. During taunts by Conservative MPs in the House of Commons in March 1966, Cardin shouted out across the floor of the House, "What about Monsignor?" Although he got the name wrong and later insisted that he thought Gerda Munsinger had died, the media brought attention to the issue, and there was a federal inquiry that caught the public's attention for its implications to national security during the Cold War.

He was appointed Assistant Chairman of the Tax Review Board in April 1972 and Chairman of the Tax Review Board in 1975. He was appointed Chief Judge of the Tax Court of Canada on July 18, 1983.

References

External links
 

1919 births
1988 deaths
Judges of the Tax Court of Canada
Canadian King's Counsel
Liberal Party of Canada MPs
Members of the House of Commons of Canada from Quebec
Members of the King's Privy Council for Canada
Université de Montréal alumni
Politicians from Providence, Rhode Island
Royal Canadian Navy officers
Loyola College (Montreal) alumni